Lauchlin Bernard Currie (October 8, 1902 – December 23, 1993) worked as White House economic adviser to President Franklin Roosevelt during World War II (1939–45). From 1949 to 1953, he directed a major World Bank mission to Colombia and related studies. Information from the Venona project, a counter-intelligence program undertaken by agencies of the United States government,  references him in nine partially decrypted cables sent by agents of the Soviet Union. He became a Colombian citizen after the United States refused to renew his passport in 1954, due to doubts of his loyalty to the United States engendered by the testimony of former Communist agents and information in the Venona decrypts.

Formative years
He was born to Lauchlin Bernard Currie, an operator of a fleet of merchant ships, and Alice Eisenhauer Currie, a schoolteacher. After his father died in 1906, when Currie was four, his family moved to nearby Bridgewater, Nova Scotia where most of his schooling was done.

By the time his family moved to Massachusetts he had begun to demonstrate his studious habits and often read late into the night. For relaxation he drove automobiles "with his foot on the floor board." He also attended school in California, where he had relatives. In 1922, after two years at Saint Francis Xavier University in Nova Scotia, Currie moved to the United Kingdom to study at the London School of Economics under Edwin Cannan, Hugh Dalton, A. L. Bowley, and Harold Laski.

From the LSE, Currie moved to Harvard University, where his chief inspiration was Allyn Abbott Young, then president of the American Economic Association. At Harvard, he earned his Ph.D. in 1931 for a dissertation on banking theory.

Early professional life
Currie remained at Harvard until 1934 as a lecturer and assistant to, successively, Ralph Hawtrey, John H. Williams, and Joseph Schumpeter. Paul Sweezy was one of his students in money and banking at Harvard. Among his associates in Cambridge was Abraham George Silverman, who would later be revealed as a Soviet spy for the Ware Group.

In a January, 1932 Harvard memorandum on antidepression policy, Currie and fellow instructors Harry Dexter White and Paul T. Ellsworth urged large fiscal deficits coupled with open market operations to expand bank reserves, as well as the lifting of tariffs and the relief of interallied debts.

In 1934, Currie constructed the first money supply and income velocity series for the United States. He blamed the government's "commercial loan theory" of banking for monetary tightening in mid-1929, when the economy was already declining, and then for its passivity during the next four years in the face of mass liquidations and bank failures. Instead, he advocated control of the money supply to stabilize income and expenditures. Currie cited his colleague and Soviet agent Silverman for his "many helpful suggestions and criticisms" in the formation of this line of thinking.

New Deal

Freshman brain trust
In 1934, Currie became a naturalized United States citizen and joined Jacob Viner's "freshman brain trust" at the U.S. Treasury where he outlined an ideal monetary system for the United States which included a 100-percent reserve banking plan to strengthen central bank control and prevent bank panics in the future by preventing member banks from lending out their demand deposit liabilities, while removing reserve requirements on savings deposits with low turnover. Later that year, Marriner Eccles moved from the Treasury to become governor of the Federal Reserve Board. He took Currie with him as his personal assistant. Harry Dexter White, another "freshman brain trust" recruit, became a top adviser to Secretary of the Treasury Henry Morgenthau, and for some years White and Currie worked closely in their respective roles at the Treasury and the Federal Reserve.

Soon afterwards, Currie drafted the Banking Act of 1935 which reorganized the Federal Reserve and strengthened its powers. He also constructed a "net federal income-creating expenditure series" to show the strategic role of fiscal policy in complementing monetary policy to revive an economy in exceptionally acute, persisting depression. Currie's preferred 100-percent reserve banking idea, however, was not one of the reforms implemented. Alan Meltzer wrote in his history of the Federal Reserve that "Lauchlin Currie wrote a remarkable memo for a Treasury committee in 1934 emphasizing the role of money in cyclical fluctuations, at a time when virtually no one thought that money mattered."  After four years of recovery, the economy declined sharply in 1937. In a four-hour interview with President Roosevelt, he was able to explain that the declared aim of balancing the budget "to restore business confidence" had damaged the economy. This was part of the "struggle for the soul of FDR" between the cautious Morgenthau and the expansionist Eccles. In April 1938, the president asked Congress for major appropriations for spending on relief and public works. In May 1939, the rationale was explained in theoretical and statistical detail by Currie ("Mr. Inside") and by Harvard's Alvin Hansen ("Mr. Outside") in testimony before the Temporary National Economic Committee to highlight the role of government deficits in the recovery process.

White House
Named FDR's White House economist in July 1939, Currie advised on taxation, social security, and the speeding up of peacetime and wartime production plans. In January 1941, he was sent on a mission to China for discussions with Generalissimo Chiang Kai-shek and Chou En-lai, the Communist representative in the Chinese wartime capital of Chungking. On his return in March, he recommended that China be added to the lend-lease program. He was put in charge of its administration under the overall direction of FDR's special assistant Harry Hopkins.

Currie was also assigned to expedite the American Volunteer Group (Flying Tigers), which consisted largely of U.S. military pilots released for combat on behalf of China against Japan and technically part of the Chinese Air Force under the command of Claire Chennault. Currie also organized a large training program in the United States for Chinese pilots. In May 1941, he presented a paper on Chinese aircraft requirements to General George C. Marshall and the Joint War Board. The document, accepted by the Board, stressed the role of an air force in China could play in defending Singapore, the Burma Road, and the Philippines against Japanese attack. It pointed to its potential for strategic bombing of targets in Japan itself. These activities, together with Currie's work in helping to tighten sanctions against Japan, are said to have played a part in provoking Japan's attack on Pearl Harbor.

Currie returned to Chungking in July 1942 to try to patch up the strained relations between Chiang and General Joseph W. Stilwell, commander of U.S. forces in China. Currie was one of several of FDR's envoys who recommended Stilwell's recall and reassignment. Back in Washington, Roosevelt asked Currie to put his case to General Marshall, but the General dismissed the idea. Only much later did Marshall concede that his protégé's continued presence in China was indeed a mistake. Stilwell was recalled in October 1944.

From 1943 to 1944, Currie served as Deputy Administrator for the Foreign Economic Administration where he played a major role in recruiting or recommending economists and others throughout the Washington administration. Prominent examples are John Kenneth Galbraith, Richard Gilbert, Adlai Stevenson, and William O'Dwyer. While at the FEA, Currie became a founding member of the War Agencies Employees Protective Association, an organization created to help civilian Federal employees acquire life insurance while serving in war zones. Currie served as WAEPA's first president from May 1943 until his retirement in June 1945. In 1944–1945, he was involved in loan negotiations between the United States, British and Soviet allies, and in preparations for the 1944 Bretton Woods conference (staged mainly by Harry Dexter White), which led to the creation of the International Monetary Fund and the World Bank. In early 1945, Currie headed a tripartite (U.S., British, and French) mission to Bern to persuade the Swiss to freeze Nazi bank balances and stop further shipments of German supplies through Switzerland to the Italian front.

In July 1949, Currie headed a nine-man mission (popularly known as the Currie Mission) to Colombia on behalf of the International Bank for Reconstruction and Development (IBRD). The mission was tasked with assessing the country's economic potentialities and subsequently recommending an integrated program for economic development.

Soviet agent
After the war, Currie was one of those blamed for losing China to the control of Communists. In 1939, Currie had been identified by Communist defector Whittaker Chambers in a meeting with Roosevelt security chief Adolf Berle, as a Soviet agent. Spring of 1944, Currie informed Soviet contacts that the United States VENONA program was about to break the Soviet signals code. 

Elizabeth Bentley, like Chambers, a former Soviet espionage agent, later claimed in Congressional testimony in 1948 that Currie and Harry Dexter White had been part of the Silvermaster ring. Although she had never met Currie or White in person, Bentley testified to receiving information through cutouts (couriers) who were other Washington economists (later determined to be Soviet agents). 

White and Currie appeared before the House Committee on Un-American Activities in August 1948 to rebut her charges. White, who was also implicated as a source of Soviet intelligence (later confirmed in Venona intercepts and review of Soviet KGB notes of NKVD official Gaik Ovakimian) had a serious heart problem, and died three days after his appearance at the hearings.

Currie was not prosecuted and in 1949 he was appointed to head the first of the World Bank's comprehensive country surveys in Colombia. After his report was published in Washington in September 1950, he was invited by the Colombian government to return to Bogotá as adviser to a commission established to implement the report's recommendations. In December 1952, Currie gave evidence in New York to a grand jury investigating Owen Lattimore's role in the publication of secret State Department documents in Amerasia magazine.

However, when Currie, as a U.S. citizen, tried to renew his passport in 1954, he was refused, ostensibly on the grounds that he was now residing abroad and married to a Colombian. However, he may have in fact been identified with the then-secret Venona project, which had decrypted wartime Soviet cables where Currie was identified as a source of Soviet intelligence.

He appears in the Venona cables under the cover name 'PAGE', and in Soviet intelligence archives as 'VIM' and as a source for the Golos and Bentley spy networks.

According to John Earl Haynes and Harvey Klehr, evidence that Currie cooperated with Soviet espionage is convincing and substantial.

Historians Allen Weinstein and Christopher Andrew also conclude Currie was a Soviet asset.

Colombia

After a military coup in Colombia in 1953, Currie retired from economic advisory work and devoted himself to raising Holstein cattle on a farm outside Bogotá, and developed the highest-yielding dairy herd in the country. With the return of civilian government in 1958, President Alberto Lleras personally conferred Colombian citizenship upon him, and Currie returned to advisory work for a succession of Colombian presidents. 

Between 1966 and 1971, he traveled abroad as a visiting professor in North American and British universities: Michigan State (1966), Simon Fraser (1967–1968 and 1969–1971), Glasgow (1968–1969) and Oxford (1969). He returned permanently to Colombia in May 1971 at the behest of President Misael Pastrana Borrero to be the architect of a new "Plan of the Four Strategies", with focus on urban housing and export diversification. The plan was implemented, with new institutions playing a major role in accelerating Colombia's urbanization.

Currie was chief economist at the Colombian National Planning Department from 1971 to 1981, followed by twelve years at the Colombian Institute of Savings and Housing until his death in 1993. There he doggedly defended the unique housing finance system (based on "units of constant purchasing power" for both savers and borrowers) established in 1972. The system significantly boosted Colombia's growth.

Currie advised on urban planning and played a major part in the first United Nations Habitat conference in Vancouver in 1976. His "cities-within-the-city" urban design and financing proposals (including the public recapture of land's socially created "valorización" or "unearned land value increments" as cities grow) were explained in Taming the Megalopolis published in 1976. He was also a professor at the National University of Colombia, the Javeriana University, and the University of the Andes. 

His writings were heavily influenced by his Harvard mentor Allyn Young. An important paper on Youngian endogenous growth theory was published posthumously in History of Political Economy (1997).

President César Gaviria awarded Currie Colombia's highest peacetime decoration, the Order of Boyaca, on the day before Garviria's death.

Death
Currie died on December 23, 1993, aged 91, of a heart attack in Bogota, Colombia.

Publications
Books
 The Supply and Control of Money in the United States. Cambridge, Mass.: Harvard University Press (1934). .
His influential early work on monetary theory and policy, based on his 1931 PhD thesis, Bank Assets and Banking Theory. Included an essay on Currie's contribution to monetary theory, by Karl Brunner.
 Operación Colombia: un programa nacional de desarrollo económico y social. Bogotá, Colombia: Sociedad de Economistas (1961).
Accelerating Development: The Necessity and the Means. New York: McGraw-Hill (1966). .
 Obstacles to Development. East Lansing: Michigan State University Press (1967).
 Governmental Planning and Political Economy, with by Yngve Larsson and Pieter deWolff. Berkeley: University of California, Berkeley (1967). .
 Taming the Megalopolis: A Design for Urban Growth. New York: Pergamon Press, with the United Nations (1976). .
 The Role of Economic Advisers in Developing Countries. Santa Barbara, Calif.: Greenwood Press (1981). .

Articles
 "Federal Reserve Policy, 1921-1930: A Rejoinder." American Economic Review, vol. 21, no. 3 (1931), pp. 502–502. .
 "Treatment of Credit in Contemporary Monetary Theory." Journal of Political Economy, vol. 41, no. 1 (Feb. 1933), pp. 58–79. .
 "Money, Gold, and Income in the United States, 1921-32." Quarterly Journal of Economics, vol. 48, no. 1 (Nov. 1933), pp. 77–95. . .
 "A Note on Income Velocities." Quarterly Journal of Economics, vol. 48, no. 2 (Feb. 1934), pp. 353–354. . .
 "The Failure of Monetary Policy to Prevent the Depression of 1929–32." Journal of Political Economy, vol. 42, No. 2 (Apr. 1934), pp. 145–177. .
 "The Supply and Control of Money: A Reply to Dr. B. M. Anderson, Jr." Quarterly Journal of Economics, vol. 49, No. 4 (Aug. 1935), pp. 694–704. . .
 "Some Prerequisites for Success of the Point Four Program." The Annals of the American Academy of Political and Social Science, vol. 270, no. 1 (1950), pp. 102–108. .
 "The Interrelations of Urban and National Economic Planning." Urban Studies, vol. 12, no. 1 (Feb. 1975), pp. 37–46. . .

Conferences
 "Urbanization: Some Basic Issues." In: Habitat: United Nations Conference on Human Settlements, Vancouver, Canada, 31 May-11 June 1976. New York: United Nations. .

Personal papers
 Duke University's Special Collections Library, 1931-1994. .
Emphasis on Currie's own life and career.
 Hoover Institution, Stanford University, 1941-1993. .
Emphasis on papers related to China and military operations in the China-Burma-India Theater.

References

Sources

Biography
 Roger Sandilands (1990). The Life and Political Economy of Lauchlin Currie: New Dealer, Presidential Adviser, and Development Economist (with preface). Durham, NC: Duke University Press. . . 
 Obituaries in The New York Times (30 Dec 1993) and The Times of London (10 Jan 1994).

On Currie and the New Deal
 Herbert Stein (1969). The Fiscal Revolution in America. Chicago: University of Chicago Press. .
 Ronnie J. Phillips (1995). The Chicago Plan and New Deal Banking Reform. New York: M.E. Sharpe. .
 Special issue of the Journal of Economic Studies, vol. 31 (2004). Contains some of his hitherto unpublished FRB and White House memoranda.

In defense of Currie
 Roger Sandilands (2000). "Guilt by Association? Lauchlin Currie's Alleged Involvement with Washington Economists in Soviet Espionage." History of Political Economy, vol. 32, no. 4. .
 James Boughton and Roger Sandilands (Sep. 2003). "Politics and the Attack on FDR's Economists: From Grand Alliance to Cold War." Intelligence and National Security, vol. 18, no. 3. pp. 73-99. .

On allegation that Currie was a Soviet spy
 John Earl Haynes and Harvey Klehr (1999). Venona: Soviet Espionage in America in the Stalin Era. New Haven: Yale University Press. .

Further reading
 A Counterintelligence Reader. NACIC [National Counterintelligence Center], Vol. 3, Ch. 1, p. 31.
 Anonymous Russian letter to Hoover, 7 August 1943, reproduced in Venona: Soviet Espionage and the American Response, 1939–1957, edited by Robert Louis Benson and Michael Warner. Washington, D.C.: National Security Agency, Central Intelligence Agency, 1996, pp. 51–54.
 File card of Patterson contacts in regard Silvermaster. box 203, Robert P. Patterson papers, box 203, Library of Congress.
 General Bissell to General Strong, 3 June 1942; Silvermaster reply to Bissell memo, 9 June 1942; Robert P. Patterson to Milo Perkins of Board of Economic Warfare, 3 July 1942. Interlocking Subversion in Government Departments, 30 August 1955, 84th Cong., 1st sess., part 30, pp. 2562–2567.
 Hanyok, Robert J. "Eavesdropping on Hell: Historical Guide to Western Communications Intelligence and the Holocaust, 1939–1945. Ft. Meade, MD: National Security Agency, Center for Cryptologic History, 2005.
"Currie, known as PAZh (Page) and White, whose cover names were YuRIST (Jurist) and changed later to LAJER (Lawyer), had been used as sources of information by Soviet agents since the 1930s, though there has been much dispute as to whether their involvement was witting or otherwise. They had been identified as Soviet sources in Venona translations and by other agents turned witnesses or informants for the FBI and Justice Department. From the Venona translations, both were known to have been sources of information for their so-called "handlers", notably the Silvermaster network."
 Haynes, John E. and Harvey Klehr. Venona: Decoding Soviet Espionage in America. Yale University Press, 2000.
 Haynes, John E. and Harvey Klehr. In Denial: Historians, Communism, & Espionage. Encounter Press, 2003.
 Schecter, Jerrold and Leona. Sacred Secrets: How Soviet Intelligence Operations Changed American History. Potomac Press, 2002.
 Laidler, David, and Roger Sandilands. "An Early Harvard Memorandum on Anti-Depression Policies: An Introductory Note." History of Political Economy, Vol. 34, No. 3, 2002, pp. 515–532. .
 Lauchlin Currie testimony, 13 August 1948, U.S. Congress, House of Representatives, Committee on Un-American Activities, 80th Cong., 2d sess., 851–877.
 Report on Currie Interview, 31 July 1947. FBI Silvermaster file, serial 2794.
 Underground Soviet Espionage Organization (NKVD) in Agencies of the United States Government, 21 February 1946. FBI Silvermaster file, serial 573.
 Vassiliev, Alexander."Notes on Soviet SVR archives."
 Warner, Michael, and Robert Louis Benson. "Venona and Beyond: Thoughts on Work Undone." Intelligence and National Security, Vol. 12, No. 3, July 1997, pp. 10–11.
 Weinstein, Allen, and Alexander Vassiliev. The Haunted Wood: Soviet Espionage in America—The Stalin Era. Modern Library, 2000.

External links

 Lauchlin Currie at Enciclopedia Banrepcultural
 Venona: Soviet Espionage and the American Response, 1939–1957
 Politics and the Attack on FDR's Economists
 Annals of the Flying Tigers
 Lauchlin Bernard Currie Papers, 1931–1994 and undated (bulk 1950–1990) at Rubenstein Library, Duke University
 FBI file on Currie in four parts, released under the Freedom of Information Act
 Collection of works by Lauchlin Currie in the FRASER digital archive (Federal Reserve Bank of St. Louis)

1902 births
1993 deaths
Alumni of the London School of Economics
Canadian emigrants to the United States
Canadian economists
Harvard University alumni
People from Bridgewater, Nova Scotia
American people in the Venona papers
Naturalized citizens of Colombia
People who renounced United States citizenship
20th-century American economists